Plus One may refer to:

Arts, entertainment, and media
 Plus One (2008 film), a Russian comedy film
 Plus One (2019 film), an American romantic comedy film
 Plus One (band), a Christian pop band
 Plus One: The Home Video, 2001
 Plus One (DJ), one member of Jack Beats, an English electronic-music duo from London
 Plus One (TV series), a British sitcom
"Plus One" (The X-Files), a television episode
 +1 (film), also known as Plus One, a 2013 American science fiction-horror film
 Plus One Animation, a South Korean animation studio
 +1 (also known as Plus One), a "lifeline" in the Who Wants to Be a Millionaire? franchise

Other uses
 Acorn Plus 1, an expansion for the Acorn Electron home computer
 Plus-One system, a change to the college American football championship format

See also
 +1 (disambiguation)
 OnePlus, a Chinese smartphone manufacturer
 PLOS One, a scientific journal
 TV One Plus 1, a time-shifted repeat of the New Zealand channel TV One